Alfred Saunders (12 June 1820 – 28 October 1905) was a 19th-century New Zealand politician.

Early life
Saunders was born in 1820 in Market Lavington, the youngest son of Mary and Amram Saunders. He was educated in Market Lavington and at a Bristol academy. William Saunders (1823–1895) was a younger brother.

He married Rhoda Flower in 1847. They had ten children, including Sarah Page.

Political career

He was elected onto the Nelson Provincial Council representing Waimea South in 1855 and remained a councillor until his election of Superintendent for the Nelson Province from 1865 to 1867. He was elected as Member of Parliament for Waimea in 1861, and he resigned from this seat in 1864. He then represented Cheviot from 1878 to 1881 when he was defeated.

From 1889 to 1890 he represented the Lincoln electorate and from 1890 to 1896 he represented Selwyn, being defeated at the general election of 1896 for the latter constituency.
He supported the Temperance Union petition in favour of woman's suffrage to Parliament in 1891.

Authorship
Alfred Saunders was an author and his published titles include;
 "History of New Zealand" a comprehensive two volume publication (550 pages.) 1896–99. Contains much on early NZ Governments. Available on line.
 "The Perfect Draft Horse" 1886
 "Tales of a Pioneer" published by his daughters, 1927. Also available on line
 "Our Domestic Birds" 1883
 "Our Horses" 1885.

References

Further reading

 

1820 births
1905 deaths
Superintendents of New Zealand provincial councils
Members of the New Zealand House of Representatives
Members of the Nelson Provincial Council
Unsuccessful candidates in the 1881 New Zealand general election
Unsuccessful candidates in the 1887 New Zealand general election
Unsuccessful candidates in the 1896 New Zealand general election
Unsuccessful candidates in the 1884 New Zealand general election
New Zealand MPs for South Island electorates
19th-century New Zealand politicians